The J Award of 2019 is the fifteenth annual J Awards, established by the Australian Broadcasting Corporation's youth-focused radio station Triple J. The announcement comes at the culmination of Ausmusic Month (November). A new award was added in 2019, You Done Good Award. This was added to the existing four awards; Australian Album of the Year, Double J Artist of the Year, Australian Music Video of the Year and Unearthed Artist of the Year.

The eligible period took place between November 2018 and October 2019. The winners were announced live on air on Triple J on Thursday 21 November 2019.

Awards

Australian Album of the Year

Double J Artist of the Year

Australian Video of the Year

Unearthed Artist of the Year

You Done Good Award
An award to an Australian who has "made an impact on the industry through outstanding achievement, social change or altruistic endeavours".

References

2019 in Australian music
2019 music awards
J Awards